Schola Antiqua may refer to

Schola Antiqua of New York John Blackley
Schola Antiqua (Spanish early music group)
Schola Antiqua of Chicago